Richard Cobbold (1797 – 5 January 1877) was a British writer.

Life 
Richard Cobbold was born in 1797 in the Suffolk town of Ipswich, to John (1746–1835) and the poet and writer Elizabeth (née Knipe) Cobbold (1764–1824). The Cobbolds were a large and affluent family who made their money from the brewing industry. 

Educated at Caius College, Cambridge, Cobbold entered the church, starting at St Mary-le-Tower in Ipswich before moving to Wortham in 1825 with his wife and three sons.  
He remained there until his death on 5 January 1877.

Cobbold is best known as the author of the History of Margaret Catchpole, a novel based on the romantic adventures of a woman living in the neighbourhood of Ipswich, in whom Cobbold's father had taken a kindly interest. For the copyright of this book he is said to have received £1,000. However Cobbold did not make much money by his other literary ventures, which were mostly undertaken for charitable purposes. Thus his account of Mary Ann Wellington brought in no less than £600, much of it in small gifts, for the subject of the book, who was afterwards placed in an almshouse by Cobbold's exertions.

Family
In 1822, he married the only daughter of Jeptha Waller, by whom he had three sons.
One of the sons, Edward Augustus (born 1825), became vicar of the neighbouring parish of Yaxley, and another Thomas Spencer, a leading parasitologist.

Legacy
During his time at Wortham, more significantly, he recorded the daily lives of his various parishioners, both in words and pictures. His four volumes eventually found a home at the Suffolk Record Office, and have become an invaluable source of information about everyday life in the countryside at that time. In 1977 a book entitled The Biography of a Victorian Village was published, in which Ronald Fletcher presents Richard Cobbold's account of 1860s Wortham.

Work 
Cobbold achieved considerable success with his popular historical novels which include:

The History Of Margaret Catchpole: A Suffolk Girl (1845)
Mary Anne Wellington: The Soldier's Daughter, Wife and Widow (1846)
Zenon The Martyr: A Record of the Piety, Patience and Persecution of the Early Christian Nobles (1847)
Freston Tower: A Tale of the Times of Cardinal Wolsey (1850)
The Young Man's Home (1848)
JH Stegall, a Real History of a Suffolk Man (1851)
The Biography Of A Victorian Village  – Wortham (1860)
Cobbold's Wortham - The Portrait of a Victorian Village (2019) Edited by Sue Heaser - Publication of Cobbold's watercolours and notes of Wortham 1860.

Adaptations
The History Of Margaret Catchpole: A Suffolk Girl became the 1887 play An English Lass by Alfred Dampier and C.H. Krieger, which formed the basis for the film The Romantic Story of Margaret Catchpole (1912)

References

Attribution

External links 
 
 
 Richard Cobbold: The Character of Woman, London 1848, PDF
 

1797 births
1877 deaths
Writers from Ipswich
Richard Cobbold
Alumni of Gonville and Caius College, Cambridge
English male novelists
19th-century English novelists
19th-century English male writers